Words Words Words refers to both a stand-up comedy routine and the derivative album by American comedian Bo Burnham.  The live performance debuted at the Boston House of Blues on May 21, 2010, and the album is derived from a special live performance of the same set at Carolines on Broadway on June 30, 2010.  In addition to the Carolines performance, the album has two studio singles, "Words, Words, Words" and "Oh Bo".

The House of Blues debut performance and the Carolines on Broadway performances were released on DVD and MP3/CD, respectively, with the constituent material from the set being generally well received.  The album alone charted on four separate Billboard charts, topping out at number one on the Billboard Comedy chart.

Stand-up show

Burnham debuted his stand-up routine, Words Words Words, at the Boston House of Blues on May 21, 2010 (postponed from April 16, 2010).  This was recorded as the inaugural performance of Comedy Central's "House of Comedy Live from House of Blues" series.  Burnham shared his debut evening at the House of Blues with fellow stand-up comedian Myq Kaplan.  The one-hour special of Words Words Words aired on October 16, 2010, to over 700,000 viewers, and was released on an unrated one-disc DVD three days later (October 19).  , Burnham was the youngest artist to garner his own hour-long special on Comedy Central.  The DVD is presented in anamorphic widescreen and Dolby Digital 5.1 surround sound and has, in addition to the special, two music videos for the songs "Words, Words, Words" and "Oh Bo".

In August 2010, Burnham was nominated for "Best Comedy Show" at the 2010 Edinburgh Comedy Awards—"the world’s most prestigious comedy prize" with a £10,000 cash prize—after his performance of Words Words Words at the 2010 Edinburgh Fringe Festival.  He was instead awarded the "Panel Prize"—carrying a £5,000 prize—for "the show or act who has most captured the comedy spirit of the 2010 Fringe".

Album
Words Words Words was released by Comedy Central Records as a music download on both Amazon.com and the iTunes Store on October 18, 2010, and on a single Compact Disc on October 19, 2010.  All live tracks for the CD were recorded at Carolines on Broadway on June 30, 2010.

Track listing

Reception

Critical response to Words Words Words, both the album and DVD, has been mostly positive. Francis Rizzo III, of DVD Talk, praises Words Words Words, citing Burnham's excellent wordplay coupled with an age-defying stage presence and fluidity.  SanDiego.com's Gordon Downs spoke highly of Words Words Words; after describing the two studio songs as "sounding like a modern day Ray Stevens coupled with the slick production of a Yes album", Downs lauded the live set's flow and energy and Burnham's skill with his material.  Bill Brownstein of Montreal's The Gazette praised Burnham's wit claiming "[h]e could be the love child of Allen Ginsberg and George Carlin.  And there's no telling what kind of comedy monster he can morph into by the time he hits 30 – even 25."

Allmusic's David Jeffries said of the album, "...if you happen to enjoy the way Burnham turns from erudite to ignorant on a dime, then Words Words Words is the gift that keeps on giving.  Things move fast in this act, giving the home listeners a distinct advantage over the audience captured here, who often seem to be laughing five seconds after the fact as they unravel the wordplay.  ...  Hilarious, plus you get the thrill of feeling smug and horrible at the very same time."

About.com's Patrick Bromley again praised Burnham's dense wordplay and cleverness, but felt that the artist was simply re-treading the same ground without making any significant advances.  Whereas Bromley saw Burnham's from-the-bedroom charm as a boon to 2009's Bo Burnham, he opined the re-invention as a self-aware brash wunderkind was not an improvement.  In contrast to any perceived deficiencies in the music, Bromley felt the traditional stand-up tracks to be the distinguishing factor of the album.

Chart positions
The Words Words Words album is Burnham's first album to break into the Billboard top 40 charts, and sold over 10,000 copies in its first week.  However, on the second week, the album fell 121 places to number 161 (selling only 3,000 copies).

References

2010 live albums
Bo Burnham albums
Comedy Central Records live albums
Stand-up comedy albums
Spoken word albums by American artists
Live spoken word albums
Live comedy albums
Stand-up comedy on DVD
2010s comedy albums
Albums produced by Kool Keith